"Sound" is a song written by Jim Glennie, Larry Gott, and Tim Booth, recorded by Manchester band James for their fourth studio album, Seven (1992). Clocking in at over six and a half minutes on the album, the song was shortened considerably for the single version. The CD release featured both the album and the single version, along with a dub remix of "Come Home" and an original song called "All My Sons".

Released in November 1991 as the album's first single, it reached  9 on the UK Singles Chart, becoming the second of the group's three top-10 hits. Apart from "Sit Down", "Sound" is the band's only song to enter the top 30 of the Irish Singles Chart, and it also peaked at No. 4 in Portugal and No. 28 in Australia.

Track listings

UK 7-inch and cassette single
 "Sound"
 "All My Sons"

UK and Australian CD single
 "Sound" (7-inch edit)
 "Come Home" (Youth Pressure mix)
 "All My Sons"
 "Sound" (full version)

UK 12-inch single
A1. "Sound" (full version)
A2. "Sound" (edit)
B1. "Come Home" (Youth Pressure dub mix)
B2. "All My Sons"

Charts

References

1991 singles
1991 songs
Fontana Records singles
James (band) songs